"Story of My Life" is the debut single of British singer Kristian Leontiou, written by Leontiou, Sarah Erasmus, and Pete Wilkinson. The song was produced by Ash Howes and Wilkinson and features backing vocals from Wilkinson and Erasmus. Taken from Leontiou's debut studio album, Some Day Soon (2004), it reached number nine on the UK Singles Chart in May 2004 and also charted in Germany, the Netherlands, and the Commonwealth of Independent States (CIS), where it reached number three on the region's airplay chart.

Reception

Critical
British columnist James Masterton called "Story of My Life" a "captivating" track and wrote that the song "catches the ear and the heartstrings from the moment you hear it".

Commercial
Upon the song's release in the United Kingdom, "Story of My Life" debuted at its peak of number nine on 30 May 2004, spending a total of seven weeks on the UK Singles Chart. In mainland Europe, the song appeared on the singles charts of Germany and the Netherlands. It first charted in the latter country, debuting at number 98 on the Single Top 100 on 2 October 2004. Despite charting no higher than number 82, the song lingered on the chart for 16 weeks, dropping out of the top 100 in January 2005. On 27 December 2004, the song debuted on the German Singles Chart at number 82, rising to its peak of number 70 on 24 January 2005; it spent a further four weeks on the German chart, tallying nine weeks on the listing altogether. The song was an airplay hit in the Commonwealth of Independent States, debuting within the top 300 in July 2004 and taking 11 weeks to ascend to its peak of number three in late September. Remaining on the CIS chart for 35 weeks, it was the region's 11th-most-successful song of 2004.

Track listings
UK CD single
 "Story of My Life"
 "Homecoming"

German maxi-CD single
 "Story of My Life" – 3:43
 "Homecoming" – 3:52
 "Sometimes I Wonder" – 3:25
 "Story of My Life" (CD-ROM video)

Credits and personnel
Credits are lifted from the UK CD single liner notes.

Studio
 Vocals recorded at Western Boulevard Studios (Nottingham, England)

Personnel
 Kristian Leontiou – writing, lead vocals
 Sarah Erasmus – writing, background vocals
 Pete Wilkinson – writing, background vocals, keyboards, production, strings and percussion arrangement, original programming
 Seton Daunt – guitar
 Ash Howes – additional drums, production
 Chris Lord-Alge – mixing
 Keith Udden – additional programming and engineering
 Mark Gamble – vocal recording

Charts

Weekly charts

Year-end charts

Release history

References

2004 debut singles
2004 songs
Polydor Records singles